Dazhou (达州市) is a prefecture-level city in the northeast of Sichuan.

Dazhou may also refer to:

Island
Dazhou Island, in Wanning, Hainan Province, China

Transport
Dazhou railway station, in Dazhou, Sichuan Province, China
, a station on Line 7 (Guangzhou Metro) in Panyu District, Guangzhou, Guangdong Province, China
 Dazhou station (Zhengzhou Metro), a metro station on Zhengxu line (Line 17) of Zhengzhou Metro, located in Xuchang, Henan Province, China

Towns
Dazhou, Changge (大周镇), in Changge, Xuchang, Henan
Written as "大洲镇":
Dazhou, Fengkai County, Zhaoqing, Guangdong Province
Dazhou, Pingnan County, Guangxi
Dazhou, Quzhou, in Qujiang District, Quzhou, Zhejiang Province

Township
 Dazhou, Pingjiang (大洲乡), a township in Pingjiang County, Hunan Province.

See also
Zhou (disambiguation)
Da (disambiguation)
Daizhou (代州), former Imperial Chinese prefecture